Kalininsky is a rural locality (a settlement) in Mikhaylovskoye Rural Settlement, Paninsky District, Voronezh Oblast, Russia. The population was 120 as of 2010. There are 4 streets.

Geography 
Kalininsky is located 18 km southeast of Panino (the district's administrative centre) by road. Pervomayskoye is the nearest rural locality.

References 

Rural localities in Paninsky District